The 2021 Masters Endurance Legends USA was the third season of the Masters Endurance Legends USA. It began at Sebring International Raceway 12 March and will end at Sonoma Raceway on 17 October.

Cars and Drivers

Race results
Bold indicates overall winner.

Championships standings

References

External links

Masters Endurance Legends USA
2021 Masters Endurance Legends